The CWA World Heavyweight Championship was a professional wrestling world heavyweight championship and the top title of the German professional wrestling promotion Catch Wrestling Association (CWA). The title was created on August 2, 1973 and deactivated on December 4, 1999. The championship was contested under 15 three-minute rounds.

The title changed hands in four countries South Africa, Austria, the United States, and Germany and three continents - Africa, Europe, and North America.

Combined reigns

See also
Catch Wrestling Association

References

External links
Wrestling-Titles.com

Catch Wrestling Association championships
World heavyweight wrestling championships